Yuri Stankevich (July 24, 1976, Saratov) is a Russian political figure, deputy of the 8th State Duma. 

From 1993 to 2001, Stankevich served at the Russian Armed Forces. In 2011-2021, he served as an assistant to the Deputy of the State Duma of the 6th and 7th convocations. In 2013, he was appointed Head of the Department for Work with Federal Authorities and Public Organizations of PJSC Lukoil. Since September 2021, he has served as Deputy of the 8th State Duma from the Chuvashia constituency. In March 2022, he was appointed head of the new project titled "Green Economy" aimed at reducing environmental risks.

References

1976 births
Living people
United Russia politicians
21st-century Russian politicians
Eighth convocation members of the State Duma (Russian Federation)